Morwenna is the eponymous patron saint of Morwenstow, a civil parish and village in north Cornwall, UK. Her name is thought to be cognate with Welsh morwyn "maiden", although the first name is also used in Brittany and said to be composed of "Mor" and "Gwenn", meaning "White sea" in Breton.

Life
Morwenna first appears in a 12th-century life of Saint Nectan that lists her alongside Endelient, Mabyn and Menfre (among many others) as a daughter of the Welsh king Brychan.

She was trained in Ireland before crossing over to Cornwall. Morwenna made her home in a little hermitage at Hennacliff (the Raven's Crag), afterwards called Morwenstow (meaning "Morwenna's holy-place"). It stands near the top of a high cliff overlooking the Atlantic Ocean, where the sea is almost constantly stormy, and from where, in certain atmospheric conditions, the coast of Wales can be seen. She built a church there, for the local people, with her own hands. It is said that she carried the stone on her head from beneath the cliff and where she once stopped for a rest, a spring gushed forth to the west of the church.

Early in the sixth century, while she lay dying, her brother, St. Nectan, came to see her, and she asked him to raise her up so that she might look once more on her native shore. She was buried at the church in Morwenstow.

A painting was later found on the north wall of the Morwenstow church, thought to represent St. Morwenna. It shows a gaunt female clasping a scroll to her breast with her left hand; the right arm is raised in blessing over a kneeling monk.

A local saint, she is depicted in a stained glass window of the parish church, St Morwenna and St John the Baptist's (Saint John was added as a dedication  when the church was given to St John the Baptist's hospital in Bridgwater).

Morwenna of Morwenstow is commonly misidentified with "Marwenne" of Marhamchurch and the patron of Lamorran, a saint "Moren".

Morwenna's Well
According to Nicholas Orme, a well in the parish (at ) is nowadays associated with her; to the west of the church,' halfway down a precipice' is now alas dry. The Holy Well of St. Morwenna is an English Heritage listed building.

References

See also
Christianity in Cornwall

Children of Brychan
Medieval Cornish saints
Female saints of medieval Wales
Holy wells in Cornwall

6th-century deaths
Year of birth unknown
Year of death unknown